A subdistrict' is one of the smaller administrative divisions of China. It is a form of township-level division which is typically part of a larger urban area, as opposed to a discrete town (zhèn, 镇) surrounded by rural areas, or a rural township (xiāng, 乡).

In general, urban areas are divided into subdistricts and a subdistrict is sub-divided into several residential communities or neighbourhoods as well as into villagers' groups (居民区/居住区, 小区/社区, 村民小组).

The subdistrict's administrative agency is the subdistrict office or simply the jiedao ban (街道办, jiēdào bàn). Because of the influence of the literal meaning of the Chinese word for 'subdistrict' (street [街道, jiedao]), the term is prone to alternative translations like 'street community'.

See also 
  (社区, Shequ) —  residential neighborhood subdivisions administrated by subdistricts.

Notes

References 

 01
.
Administrative divisions of China